Pānini Tapobhumi (Nepali: पाणिनि तपोभुमि) is a Hindu temple site located on the high hill of Panena village in the Arghakhanchi district of Lumbini province, in Nepal. This religious place derives its name from sage Pānini, a Sanskrit philologist, grammarian, and revered scholar in ancient India, and is known as a locale where he performed penance.

According to legend, Pānini came to Panena from what is currently Lahore, Pakistan and stayed at Panena, where he performed penance and authored his work "Ashtadhyayi", a treatise on Sanskrit grammar. It is also claimed that Pānini's Sanskrit grammar helped advance modern computer and information technology.

Panini Tapobhumi houses many temples and archaeological sites and is believed to be an interesting tourist destination.

History 
It is believed that about 1,200 years ago Pānini, from Lahore, came to Panena, a small village in Arghakhanchi district of Lumbini province in search of performing penance. Lord Shiva was impressed by Pānini's devotion and austerity and he played the drums and uttered fourteen sutras such as Aiun, and Rilruk. He gave the 14 sutras as blessing to the sage Pānini, which he used to write the Sanskrit Grammar treatise called Astadhyai.

Legend holds that Pānini was born in Shalatur, Pakistan (later known as Lahore), the son of a wealthy father. He was not diligent in his studies and was often critiqued by his classmates. His parents sent him to his maternal uncle's home in Pataliputra (Patna) where he began learning at Takshashila University.

While at Takshasila University, Pānini lost an exam result against his friend Katyayan. His maternal aunt counseled him that success could be achieved by worshipping Shiva in the Himalayan region, and thus he went in search of the Himalayas to do penance. He arrived at a beautiful place in the eastern part of Arghakhanchi, Nepal, and used his body, mind and soul to do penance for Lord Shiva. Lord Shankara appeared at the place where Pānini had done penance, played the Damaru 14 times and gave him blessings.

References 

Hindu temples in Lumbini Province
Buildings and structures in Arghakhanchi District